Desktop Theater was a digital performance project created by Adriene Jenik and Lisa Brenneis that ran from 1997 to 2002. The project consisted of a series of early experiments in network performances using online discussion rooms and visual chat applications such as The Palace. The objective was to introduce a compelling way for the public to interact with theater online and the audiences responses in the chat room were seen as an important element of the work. The project created over 40 web-based performances during its lifetime.

Using The Palace, the company would enter the online environment and using avatars, create adaptations of stage performances. One adaptation performed was waitingforgodot.com, based on Waiting for Godot by Samuel Beckett. Everything that would conventionally be seen on a live stage (e.g. scenery, gestures, emotions, and speech) was compressed into 2D and computer speech.  This subgenre of digital performance is also known as cyberformance. 

Besides adaptations of plays, the Desktop Theater project also created improvisations, activities, active verses, and workshops. With each work, the project strove to eliminate the distance between performer and audience.

Archive

Plays

waitingforgodot.com - Third Annual Digital Storytelling Festival (1997)
Spectacled Society - Palace Mansion (2000)
The World of Park - Palace Mansion (2000)
Invisible Interludes - Santaman's Harvest Digital Arts & Culture (1999)
WaterWars[2] - Transit III Festival of Women in Theater, Odin teatret, Holstebro, Denmark and the Genetically Enhanced Palace (2001)

Improvisations

Barnstorming the Palace  - Palace Mansion (2000)
FatGirls Prop - Palace Mansion (2000)
Mom & Larky - Palace Mansion (2000)
Moments in Palace Culture - Palace Mansion (2000)
SuperSchmoozio - Live at The Kitchen, New York City, New York & in Genetically Enhanced Palace (2001)
BagoCats - Beall Center for the Arts, Irvine, California (2000)

Activities
Source:

Dreams

First Night Dream-  Genetically Enhanced Palace (2000)
Thigh Dream- Genetically Enhanced Palace (2000)
Lindsay's Flying Dream -Genetically Enhanced Palace (2000)
Nancy's Dream -Genetically Enhanced Palace (2000)
Die 4 Dixie Dream -Genetically Enhanced Palace (2000)
Kitten Dream -Genetically Enhanced Palace (2000)
River of Salsa Dream -Genetically Enhanced Palace (2000)
Mike's Dream - Genetically Enhanced Palace (2000)
Dreaming in Public - Palace Mansion (2000)
LaBone's Dream - LaBone's Dream (2000)
Windy Dream - Genetically Enhanced Palace (2000)
Bookmark Dream_version 2 - Genetically Enhanced Palace (2000)
Connie's Dream - Genetically Enhanced Palace (2000)
LizardPeople Dream - Genetically Enhanced Palace (2000)
Jack's Dream - Genetically Enhanced Palace (2000)
AdrieneMagentaPool Dream - Genetically Enhanced Palace / Dreamroom (2001)
NancyCreepyDream - Genetically Enhanced Palace / Dreamroom (2000)
Blind Dreamer - Genetically Enhanced Palace / Dreamroom (2001)
Connie's XXX Dream - Genetically Enhanced Palace / Dreamroom (2001)
ConnieshooterDream - Genetically Enhanced Palace / Dreamroom (2000)
LisaREMdream - Genetically Enhanced Palace / Dreamroom (2001)
Nancy's Son's Bike - Genetically Enhanced Palace / Dreamroom (2001)

Rituals

DeathDance - Genetically Enhanced Palace (2000)
Computer Club - Genetically Enhanced Palace (2000)

Active verse

Spam Poetry
BULK - Genetically Enhanced Palace / Casino Alley (2000)
Hello - Genetically Enhanced Palace / Hallway (2000)
Prescriptions - Genetically Enhanced Palace / Hallway Lite (2000)
Taxes -Genetically Enhanced Palace / Casino Alley (2000)

Songs
"12 Letters" - Genetically Enhanced Palace /Dreamroom (2001)
"Gifts from Loki" - Genetically Enhanced Palace /Dreamroom (2000)

Workshops

UCSD
WWII restaged - Genetically Enhanced Palace / various map-based rooms (2001)
Monkey King Opera - Genetically Enhanced Palace / various student-made rooms (2001)

UCI
Horror Scene - Genetically Enhanced Palace / Kitchen (2000)
Jeopardy Spoof - Genetically Enhanced Palace / Game Show Room (2000)

References

External links
Desktop Theater website

Theatre companies
Digital artists